Andrey Popovich (born 4 March 1992) is an Azerbaijani professional footballer who plays as a goalkeeper for LNZ Cherkasy.

Career

Club
Andrey Popovich began playing football in Ukraine. He played for Zakarpattia Uzhhorod and Metalurh Donetsk before signing a contract with FC Baku. In 2010 he was a part of Absheron which won Azerbaijan First Division. In 2011, he signed for Sumgayit FK followed by Turan Tovuz in 2012. In 2013, he signed with Tavşanlı Linyitspor, but in winter 2014 he returned to Sumgayit.

In June 2015, Popovich signed for Gabala FK. He left Gabala a year later, on 6 June 2016.

International
Andrey Popovich has represented Azerbaijan at all youth levels from under-17 to under-21. On 10 November 2011, he made his senior debut.

Career statistics

International

Statistics accurate as of match played 24 February 2012

Honours
Mynai
 Ukrainian First League: 2019–20

References

External links 
 
 
 
 
 

1992 births
Living people
Azerbaijani footballers
Ukrainian emigrants to Azerbaijan
Ukrainian people of Hungarian descent
Azerbaijani people of Hungarian descent
Azerbaijan international footballers
Azerbaijani expatriate footballers
Expatriate footballers in Ukraine
Azerbaijani expatriate sportspeople in Ukraine
Association football goalkeepers
Sumgayit FK players
Gabala FC players
FC Mynai players
FC LNZ Cherkasy players
Azerbaijan Premier League players
People from Chop, Ukraine
Ukrainian Premier League players
Ukrainian First League players
Ukrainian Second League players
Ukrainian Amateur Football Championship players